DSCH is used in UMTS to send packets on the downlink to the UEs. Notably it is used in HSDPA as HS-DSCH (High-Speed DSCH).

UMTS